= Six Deuce =

Global sporting goods and fitness apparel company

- Industry: Fitness, Yoga, Crossfit, Fashion
- Founded: 2005
- Headquarters: Ames, Iowa (USA) & Helsingborg, Sweden
- Area served: Worldwide
- Products: Fitness Apparel
- Website: www.sixdeuce.com www.sixdeuce.eu www.sixdeuce.pk

Six Deuce is a global sporting goods and fitness apparel company. Founded in 2005, the company is based in Ames, Iowa and Helsingborg, Sweden (European Division).

The company logo is a "6" and a "2" intertwined and outlined. Originally, the company focused solely on combat sports apparel & equipment. The design themes were mostly martial arts based: Muay Thai, Combat Sambo, Boxing, and Mixed Martial Arts. Although primarily a clothing company, Six Deuce also previously sold boxing gloves, fight shorts, and other combat sports equipment.

In 2013, most of the MMA & combat sports apparel was phased out. Currently Six Deuce concentrates on fitness clothing, specifically women's leggings. Other offerings include unisex fitness leggings, sweatshirts, T-shirts and tops.
